Ernst Carl Gerlach Stueckelberg (baptised as Johann Melchior Ernst Karl Gerlach Stückelberg, full name after 1911: Baron Ernst Carl Gerlach Stueckelberg von Breidenbach zu Breidenstein und Melsbach; 1 February 1905 – 4 September 1984) was a Swiss mathematician and physicist, regarded as one of the most eminent physicists of the 20th century. Despite making key advances in theoretical physics, including the exchange particle model of fundamental forces, causal S-matrix theory, and the renormalization group, his idiosyncratic style and publication in minor journals led to his work not being widely recognized until the mid-1990s.

Early life
Born into a semi-aristocratic family in Basel in 1905, Stueckelberg's father was a lawyer, and his paternal grandfather a distinguished Swiss artist. A highly gifted school student, Stueckelberg initially began a physics degree at the University of Basel in 1923.

Career
While still a student, Stueckelberg was invited by the distinguished quantum theorist Arnold Sommerfeld, to attend his lectures at the University of Munich. He went on to gain a Ph.D. on cathode physics in 1927. Later that year he went to Princeton University, becoming an assistant professor in 1930. He was elected a Fellow of the American Physical Society in 1931.

He returned to Switzerland in 1932, working first at the University of Basel before switching the following year to the University of Zurich. In 1934 he moved again to the University of Geneva, which together with the University of Lausanne became his principal bases for the rest of his career.

Stueckelberg's sojourn in Zurich led to contact with leading quantum theorists Wolfgang Pauli and Gregor Wentzel, which in turn led him to focus on the emerging theory of elementary particles.

In 1934 he devised a fully Lorentz-covariant perturbation theory for quantum fields. The approach proposed by Stueckelberg was very powerful, but was not adopted by others at the time, and has now been all but forgotten. However, besides being explicitly covariant, Stueckelberg's methods avoid vacuum bubbles.

Stueckelberg developed the vector boson exchange force model as the theoretical explanation of the strong nuclear force in 1935. Discussions with Pauli led Stueckelberg to drop the idea, however. It was rediscovered by Hideki Yukawa, who won a Nobel Prize for his work in 1949 — the first of several Nobel Prizes awarded for work which Stueckelberg contributed to, without recognition.

In 1938 Stueckelberg recognized that massive electrodynamics contains a hidden scalar, and formulated an affine version of what would become known as the Abelian Higgs mechanism. He also proposed the law of conservation of baryon number.

The evolution parameter theory he presented in 1941 and 1942 is the basis for recent work in relativistic dynamics.

In 1941 he proposed the interpretation of the positron as a positive energy electron traveling backward in time.

In 1943 he came up with a renormalization program to attack the problems of infinities in quantum electrodynamics (QED), but his paper was rejected by the Physical Review.

In 1952 he proved the principle of semi-detailed balance for kinetics without microscopic reversibility.

In 1953 he and the mathematician André  Petermann discovered the renormalization group.

In 1976 he was awarded the Max Planck medal.

His PhD students included Marcel Guénin.

Stueckelberg is buried at the  Cimetière des Rois (Cemetery of Kings), which is considered the Genevan Panthéon.

See also
 Timeline of atomic and subatomic physics
 Propagator
 Relativistic dynamics
 Stueckelberg action
 Stueckelberg-Feynman interpretation

Notes

References
 Cianfrani, F., and Lecian, O. M. (2007) "E.C.G. Stueckelberg: a forerunner of modern physics," Nuovo Cimento 122B: 123-133.
 Lacki, Jan, Ruegg, H., and Valentine Telegdi (1999) "The Road to Stueckelberg's Covariant Perturbation Theory as Illustrated by Successive Treatments of Compton Scattering." Studies in History and Philosophy of Modern Physics.
 Schweber, Silvan S. (1994) QED and the Men who Made It. Princeton Univ. Press: chpt. §10.1.

External links
 The edited PDF files of the physics course of Professor Stueckelberg, openly accessible, with commentary and complete biographical documents.
 blog post concerning Stueckelberg with comment by Petermann
 Oakley, C.G. "The search for Quantum Field Theory"

Swiss physicists
Fellows of the American Physical Society
1905 births
1984 deaths
Winners of the Max Planck Medal